Getting Married is a 1978 American made-for-television romantic comedy film directed by Steven Hilliard Stern, written by John Hudock, and starring Richard Thomas, Bess Armstrong, and Mark Harmon.  A man falls in love with a newscaster and attempts to win her heart before she weds another man.

Plot 
Michael Carboni, an associate director at a TV studio, falls in love with Kristine Lawrence, the station's newscaster.  However, Kristy is due to be married in a week, and Michael has yet to reveal his feelings to her.  Michael must find a way to get Kristine's affection and have her call off the wedding.

Cast 
 Richard Thomas as Michael Carboni
 Bess Armstrong as Kristine Lawrence
 Mark Harmon as Howard Lesser
 Katherine Helmond as Vera Lesser 
 Van Johnson as Phil Lawrence 
 Audra Lindley as Catherine Lawrence
 Fabian as Wayne Spanka
 Mark Lenard as Mr. Bloom

Reception 
Sherry Woods of The Miami Herald called it "a light-hearted piece of fluff". The Los Angeles Times praised the "bright dialogue and winning characterisations" but said "there's  an underlying queasiness to the premise".

References

External links 
 

1978 television films
1978 films
1978 romantic comedy films
American romantic comedy films
Films about weddings
CBS network films
Films directed by Steven Hilliard Stern
Films scored by Craig Safan
1970s American films